Qurtubah is an area in Kuwait City, Kuwait. It is located 5 miles (8 km) from Kuwait International Airport.

Nearby areas include Yarmuk (1.0 nmi or 1.8 km), Adiliya (0.7 nmi or 1.3 km), Da'iya (1.3 nmi or 2.4 km), Hadiqah (1.3 nmi or 2.4 km), Rawda (1.7 nmi or 3.1 km), Abraq Khaytan (1.5 nmi or 2.8 km) and Surrah (2.2 nmi or 4.1 km) .

External links
Satellite map at Maplandia.com

References

Populated places in Kuwait
Suburbs of Kuwait City